The Ladies' Day Vase is a registered Melbourne Racing Club Group 3 Thoroughbred horse race for mares four years old and older, run at set weights with penalties, over a distance of 1600 metres at Caulfield Racecourse, Melbourne, Australia in October. Prizemoney is A$200,000.

History
The race has been run on the second day of the MRC Spring Carnival which is on a Wednesday in mid October.

Grade
 Prior to 2006 - Handicap
2006–2012 - Listed race
2013 onwards - Group 3

Name
1994–1997 - Charles Kerville Handicap
1998 - Melbourne's 1377 3MP Plate
1999 - Liz Davenport Classic
2000–2001 - Charles Kerville Handicap
2002 - Jack Dolby Plate
2003 - Indulgence Marquee Handicap
2004 - Glasshouse Cafe at Caulfield Tabaret Handicap
2005 - Classic Caulfield Ladies' Day Vase
2006 - Perri Cutten Classic
2007–2010 - carsales.com.au Classic
2011–2012 - Race-Tech Classic
2013 - Snowhite Maintenance Classic
2014 onwards - Ladies' Day Vase

Winners

 2022 - Sirileo Miss
 2021 - Sirileo Miss
 2020 - Sovereign Award
 2019 - Spanish Reef
 2018 - I Am A Star
 2017 - Quilate
 2016 - Euro Angel
 2015 - Miss Rose De Lago
 2014 - Star Fashion
 2013 - Zonza
 2012 - Star Of Giselle
 2011 - Hi Belle
 2010 - Royal Commands
 2009 - Lady Lynette
 2008 - Miss Badoura
 2007 - Post Thyme
 2006 - Gawne
 2005 - Matras
 2004 - Loyal Lauren
 2003 - Sweet Corn
 2002 - Latte
 2001 - Piper Star
 2000 - Market Price
 1999 - Our Erin
 1998 - Touch of Fantasy
 1997 - Cheval Place
 1996 - Kalaring
 1995 - Cyclone Watch
 1994 - Cyclone Watch

See also
 List of Australian Group races
 Group races

References

Horse races in Australia
Vase sports trophies